Ovčar (Serbian Cyrillic: Овчар) is a mountain in western Serbia, near the city of Čačak. Its highest peak has an elevation of  985 meters above sea level. Along with Kablar, Ovčar forms the attractive Ovčar-Kablar Gorge of the West Morava river.

References

Mountains of Serbia